Emil Fredrik Rautaharju (1 September 1875 - 11 February 1947; original surname Zitting) was a Finnish farmer and politician. He was a member of the Parliament of Finland from 1930 to 1933, representing the National Coalition Party. Rautaharju was born in Nilsiä; Olli Zitting was his elder brother.

References

1875 births
1947 deaths
People from Nilsiä
People from Kuopio Province (Grand Duchy of Finland)
National Coalition Party politicians
Members of the Parliament of Finland (1930–33)